USS Gato has been the name of more than one United States Navy ship, and may refer to:

, a submarine in commission from 1941 to 1946
, a submarine in commission from 1968 to 1996

United States Navy ship names